Turatia foeldvarii is a moth in the family Autostichidae. It was described by László Anthony Gozmány in 1959. It is found in Egypt.

References

Moths described in 1959
Turatia